Amazon Polly is a cloud service by Amazon Web Services, a subsidiary of Amazon.com, that converts text into spoken audio. It allows developers to create speech-enabled applications and products. It was launched in November 2016 and now includes 60 voices across 29 languages, some of which are Neural Text-to-Speech voices of higher quality. Users include Duolingo, a language education platform.

See also 
 Amazon Lex
 Amazon Rekognition
 Amazon SageMaker
 Amazon Web Services
 Google Wavenet

References

Natural language processing software
Amazon Web Services
Software developer communities
Speech synthesis